The International Museum of Muslim Cultures is "America’s first Islamic history and culture museum". It was established in April 2001, in Jackson, Mississippi.

Islamic Heritage Month 
Islamic Heritage Month is an annual celebration of the world's diverse Muslim cultures, with workshops all month long and a festival of music, fun and learning.

References

Museums in Jackson, Mississippi
2001 establishments in Mississippi
Museums established in 2001